Master's Futbol Academy, commonly known as Master's FA, is a Canadian semi-professional soccer club based in Scarborough, Toronto, Ontario. The club was founded in 2009 as a soccer academy and added its team in the semi-professional League1 Ontario, the third tier in the Canadian soccer league system.

The club was one of the ten original founding men's teams in League1 Ontario, which was established in 2014.  Their team initially competed under the name Master's FA Saints.

History
In 2009, Master's Futbol Academy was founded by Junior Groves. In 2014, the semi-professional club was established to play in the newly formed League1 Ontario as one of the founding members. They were one of the three Ontario Soccer Association Recognized Non-Club Academies permitted to enter a team in the league, along with ANB Futbol and Sigma FC. The club played their debut match on May 31, 2014 against the Cataraqui Clippers, winning 3–0. In their inaugural season, they finished in seventh place.

Their most successful season came in 2019, when they won the 2019 League1 Ontario playoffs, defeating FC London 4–1 in the finals.  This victory qualified the club for the Canadian Championship for the first time in 2020. However, due to the COVID-19 pandemic, their participation was shifted to the 2021 Canadian Championship. In the match in 2021, they were defeated by Canadian Premier League club York United FC in the preliminary round by a score of 5-0.

Seasons

Notable former players
The following players have either played at the professional or international level, either before or after playing for the League1 Ontario team:

 Luis Cortez

Honours
League1 Ontario Championship (1): 2019

References

Soccer clubs in Toronto
Scarborough, Toronto
Association football clubs established in 2009
2009 establishments in Ontario
League1 Ontario teams